Lu Deming (556(?)–630) was Tang dynasty Chinese scholar, author of the Jingdian Shiwen, which provides annotations on the classics, including alternate pronunciations of characters in specific contexts. In addition to authoring this work, Lu Deming opposed the xié yùn method of reading the Odes propounded by Shen Zhong. This method adjusted the pronunciation of characters to make them rhyme in contemporary speech. Lu Deming instead explained that rhyming practices were looser in earlier periods.

References 

555 births
627 deaths
Tang dynasty writers